Balea sarsii is a species of air-breathing land snail, a terrestrial pulmonate gastropod mollusk in the family Clausiliidae.

The species has long been overlooked because of confusion with Balea perversa.

Taxonomy
The specific name sarsii is in honour of Norwegian biologist Michael Sars.

According to Welter-Schultes Balea heydeni is conspecific with Balea sarsii. The name heydenii has now been superseded as the species was described from Norway at an earlier date than von Maltzan, under the name sarsii Pfeiffer (synonym lucifuga Bourguignat 1857).

This species has been separated from the closely related, common and wide-spread Balea perversa and redescribed by Gittenberger et al. (2006) under its junior synonym name Balea heydeni von Maltzan, 1881. The valid name for this taxon is, however, Balea sarsii.

Distribution
Balea sarsii is a western-Atlantic element, found on the Atlantic Islands, in Portugal, northwestern Spain, and the coastal parts of France, Belgium and the Netherlands. In Britain and Ireland it is the commoner of the two Balea species, occurring also in the inland. The only locality in Denmark is Møns Klint. A recently undertaken revision of Balea-material from Sweden and Norway in the Göteborg Natural History Museum and the Swedish Museum of Natural History in Stockholm revealed two localities for Balea sarsii from the Swedish west coast (the Island of Vinga outside Göteborg and the Island Storön in the archipelago of Väderöarna in the province of Bohuslän). Totally the species is now known from six Norwegian localities, of which five are situated in Hordaland County. It is considered a very rare species in Norway, because only sixteen Norwegian specimens have been found, among thousands of Balea perversa.

This species is known to occur in:
 Atlantic Islands
 Portugal
 northwestern Spain
 coastal parts of France
 coastal parts of Belgium
 coastal parts of the Netherlands
 Great Britain
 Ireland
 Møns Klint in Denmark
 Sweden
 Norway: Hordaland County and Sogn og Fjordane County

The type locality is Florø in Sogn og Fjordane County. This is also the northernmost locality of Balea sarsii known in Europe.

Description

The shell of this species is sinistral (left-handed) in its coiling. Differs from Balea perversa in its more slender and yellowish rather than brownish shell. The first whorl increases in diameter more rapidly and the sculpture is more weakly striated (with coarse growth lines rather than distinct riblets).

Balea sarsii, differs from Balea perversa through its, in most cases, shorter, broader shell, in which the whorls increase more quickly in width.

Balea sarsii reaches a maximal height of 7 mm; Balea perversa might be higher (up to 10 mm). The sculpture in Balea sarsii is also more wrinkled, coarser and less regular, compared to the fine, regular riblets typical for Balea perversa. The shell colour is also yellowish – light brown, compared to the usually somewhat darker brown in Balea perversa. A weak, parietal denticle may be present in Balea perversa, but not in Balea sarsii. All these characters are, however, variable; especially the shell dimensions. The most reliable character to use in separating the two species is the form of the apical whorls: in Balea perversa this part of the shell is almost cylindrical, but in Balea sarsii it is conical.

Ecology
Balea sarsii sometimes co-occur with Balea perversa. Such sympatric occurrences are not uncommon in various parts of the distribution area, and probably both species have very similar ecology. Balea-species are rarely found on the ground, they are climbers and live on vertical surfaces (rocks, trees etc.)

References
This article incorporates CC-BY-3.0 text from the reference

External links

Balea sarsii at Animalbase

Clausiliidae
Molluscs of Europe
Gastropods described in 1847
Taxobox binomials not recognized by IUCN